Unguturu mandal is one of the 25 mandals in the Krishna district of the Indian state of Andhra Pradesh.

See also 
Villages in Unguturu mandal

References 

Mandals in Krishna district